Norma Murabito (born 12 October 1987 in Taormina, Messina) is an Italian sprint canoeist. Murabito is a member of Aniene Canoeing Club in Rome, and is coached and trained by Stefano Grillo.

Murabito qualified for the first ever women's K-1 200 metres at the 2012 Summer Olympics in London, by placing second from the European Qualification Tournament in Poznań, Poland. She paddled in the first heat against seven other canoeists, including three-time Olympic champion Nataša Dušev-Janić of Hungary, and New Zealand's Lisa Carrington, who eventually won the gold medal in the final. Murabito finished the race only in seventh place by nearly half a second (0.5) behind U.S. canoeist Carrie Johnson, with a time of 43.820 seconds. Murabito, however, failed to advance into the semi-finals, as she ranked twenty-fifth overall, and placed outside the qualifying spots for the next round.

References

External links
NBC Olympics Profile

1987 births
Italian female canoeists
Living people
Olympic canoeists of Italy
Canoeists at the 2012 Summer Olympics
Canoeists of Fiamme Azzurre
People from Taormina
Mediterranean Games silver medalists for Italy
Competitors at the 2013 Mediterranean Games
Mediterranean Games medalists in canoeing
Canoeists at the 2015 European Games
European Games competitors for Italy
Sportspeople from the Province of Messina